Norbert Franck (28 May 1918 – 4 October 2006) was a Luxembourgian swimmer. He competed in the men's 4 × 200 metre freestyle relay at the 1936 Summer Olympics.

References

1918 births
2006 deaths
Luxembourgian male freestyle swimmers
Olympic swimmers of Luxembourg
Swimmers at the 1936 Summer Olympics
Sportspeople from Esch-sur-Alzette